The UK Rock & Metal Albums Chart is a record chart which ranks the best-selling rock and heavy metal albums in the United Kingdom. Compiled and published by the Official Charts Company, the data is based on each album's weekly physical sales, digital downloads and streams. In 1998, there were 29 albums that topped the 52 published charts. The first number-one album of the year was the Queen compilation Queen Rocks, which was released the previous year and remained at number one for the opening week of 1999 at the end of a five-week run which began in the week ending 6 December 1997. The final number-one album of the year was Metallica's covers album Garage Inc., which spent the last four weeks of the year (and the first one of 1999) at number one.

The most successful album on the UK Rock & Metal Albums Chart in 1998 was Adore, the fourth studio album by American alternative rock band The Smashing Pumpkins, which spent a total of five weeks at number one. Walking into Clarksdale by former Led Zeppelin members Jimmy Page and Robert Plant, Nirvana's 1991 second studio album Nevermind and Metallica's Garage Inc each spent four weeks at number one during 1998; Pearl Jam's fifth studio album Yield, Fear Factory's third studio album Obsolete and the Aerosmith live album A Little South of Sanity were all number one for three weeks during the year; and Dookie by Green Day, Blood Sugar Sex Magik by Red Hot Chili Peppers, Virtual XI by Iron Maiden and Follow the Leader by Korn each spent two weeks atop the chart.

Chart history

See also
1998 in British music
List of UK Rock & Metal Singles Chart number ones of 1998

References

External links
Official UK Rock & Metal Albums Chart Top 40 at the Official Charts Company
The Official UK Top 40 Rock Albums at BBC Radio 1

1998 in British music
UK Rock and Metal Albums
1998